The  was an express electric multiple unit (EMU) train type introduced in 1969 by Japanese National Railways (JNR), and later operated by East Japan Railway Company (JR East) until 1996 and by Shinano Railway in Nagano Prefecture until 2013. The 169 series was developed from the 165 series EMUs.

Interior

Livery variations

Shinano Railway
The third-sector operator Shinano Railway operated a fleet of three 3-car 169 series sets (numbered S51 to S53) formerly operated by JR East. These sets were scheduled to be withdrawn from regular service in April 2013, with final runs on 29 April 2013.

Formations
The 3-car sets operated by Shinano Railway were formed as shown below, with two motored cars (KuMoHa and MoHa) and one trailer car (KuHa).

The MoHa 168 car was fitted with one lozenge-type pantograph.

Preserved examples
, four 169 series cars are preserved, as follows.
 KuMoHa 169 1: Next to Sakaki Station on the Shinano Railway in Sakaki, Nagano
 KuMoHa 169 6: Next to Karuizawa Station in Karuizawa, Nagano
 KuHa 169 27: Next to Sakaki Station on the Shinano Railway in Sakaki, Nagano
 MoHa 168 1: Next to Sakaki Station on the Shinano Railway in Sakaki, Nagano

References

External links

 

Electric multiple units of Japan
East Japan Railway Company
Shinano Railway Line
Train-related introductions in 1969
1500 V DC multiple units of Japan

ja:国鉄165系電車#169系